Uecker-Randow was a Kreis (district) in the eastern part of Mecklenburg-Western Pomerania, Germany. Neighboring districts were (from south clockwise) Uckermark in Brandenburg, Mecklenburg-Strelitz and Ostvorpommern. To the east was the West Pomeranian Voivodship of Poland.

History
Uecker-Randow District was established on 12 June 1994 by merging the previous districts of Pasewalk and Ueckermünde, along with part of the district of Strasburg. On 4 September 2011, it was merged into Vorpommern-Greifswald.

Coat of arms

Towns and municipalities
The subdivisions of the district were (situation August 2011):

References

External links

Former districts of Mecklenburg-Western Pomerania
1994 establishments in Germany
2011 disestablishments in Germany